Edgar Bentley (born 1892) was an English footballer who played as a right-back for Port Vale.

Career
Bentley played for Kidsgrove Wellington before joining Port Vale in the summer of 1914. He became a regular for Central League club and was in the North Staffordshire Infirmary Cup winning side of 1915. As the club went into abeyance during the war he guested for local rivals Stoke. Vale resumed footballing activities in the war leagues in 1916 and Bentley rejoined them in August 1916 to enjoy regular football once more. He was conscripted in March 1917, but regained his first team place upon demobilization in December 1918. However, he lost his place in August 1919, the Vale being re-elected to the English Football League in October 1919, after twelve years in the non-leagues. Bentley took part in just two Second Division games in 1919–20 and was released upon the end of the season.

Career statistics
Source:

Honours
Port Vale
North Staffordshire Infirmary Cup: 1915

References

1892 births
Year of death missing
People from Wolstanton
English footballers
Association football defenders
Port Vale F.C. players
Stoke City F.C. wartime guest players
British Army personnel of World War I
English Football League players